On 29 April 1978, the final match day of the 1977–78 Fußball-Bundesliga season, Borussia Mönchengladbach played Borussia Dortmund with the possibility of winning the Bundesliga championship. Knowing that if 1. FC Köln won their game away to FC St. Pauli, Borussia Mönchengladbach would have to win by a margin well in excess of ten goals. The match finished 12–0, which remains the largest margin of victory and tied with four other matches for the biggest win in Bundesliga history. However, 1. FC Köln beat FC St. Pauli 5–0 to become champions.

Background 
Borussia Mönchengladbach went into the match with Borussia Dortmund as reigning Bundesliga champions of the previous season. Having only won two of their first seven league games in the autumn of 1977, they had managed to reach second place in the table after 22 games. With the final round of games, the league championship went down to the wire with both Mönchengladbach and their regional rivals 1. FC Köln equal on points, but Köln having a far superior goal difference of +10.

Borussia Dortmund, on the other hand, were struggling to gain ground in their second consecutive season in the Bundesliga after promotion in 1976. Three games previously, the club had secured their Bundesliga status for the following year with a 2–0 away win over FC Schalke 04. Horst Bertram, Dortmund's number one goalkeeper, had just recovered from injury, but Dortmund's coach Otto Rehhagel decided to start with second-choice goalie Peter Endrulat, giving him a chance to present himself. Endrulat, however, was told the morning before the game, that his contract would not be extended close-season.

The two teams had drawn 3–3 at Dortmund's Westfalenstadion in December 1977, with Gladbach only claiming a point through an equalising goal in the 89th minute.

Match

Summary 

38,000 fans made it to the Rheinstadion in Düsseldorf since Mönchengladbach's usual home ground, the Bökelbergstadion, was being renovated. The match was refereed by Ferdinand Biwersi.

Although Mönchengladbach were not anticipating to win what would have been their sixth Bundesliga title, they were, nonetheless, highly motivated going into the game. Jupp Heynckes gave the home side the lead after just one minute of playing time had elapsed and in the 32nd minute, had made it 5–0 with his third goal of the game to complete his hat-trick. Going into the half-time break, the score was 6–0.

Otto Rehhagel gave a brief talk to his players during at half-time, calling upon the team to play on for their honour. No substitutes were made since no player from the bench wanted to come onto the pitch. Rehhagel asked Endrulat if he would like to be substituted, but the Dortmund goalkeeper said he had no problem with playing on. He later concluded however that this had been the wrong decision:

In the second half, Mönchengladbach's flurry of shots on goal didn't stop. Heynckes and Carsten Nielsen had made it 8–0 by the hour mark, at which time Otto Rehhagel had asked Sigfried Held to warm-up and get ready to go onto the pitch, but Held declined, saying: "Coach, do you really think I can make a difference to the outcome of the game?" Shortly afterwards, Karl Del'Haye had made the scoreline 9–0.

After further goals from Heynckes, substitute Ewald Lienen and Christian Kulik, the match finished with a final score of 12–0. Since there were no ball boys in the 1970s, the referee had to go and fetch the balls which had been shot past Dortmund's goal.

Details

Aftermath 

In spite of their 12–0 victory, Mönchengladbach missed out on the league title since 1. FC Köln beat FC St. Pauli 5–0 in Hamburg and became champions thanks to their slightly better goal difference. The supporters of St. Pauli had become skeptical when the intermediate results from Mönchengladbach had been announced and started to cheer for the team from Cologne. After the game they celebrated the championship with the guests, and a long-lasting friendship between the supporters of both teams started.
This was 1.

The day after Mönchengladbach's record victory, Rehhagel was fired from his post as Dortmund manager. Sigi Held was named as his replacement ad interim, and Carl-Heinz Rühl became the new coach on a permanent basis.

Borussia Dortmund fined all of their players 2000–2500 Deutsche Mark for their shoddy performance. The unlucky goalkeeper, Peter Endrulat, was sent packing to 2. Bundesliga team Tennis Borussia Berlin and the team was ridiculed during friendly games for weeks afterwards. Köln's goalkeeper, Toni Schumacher, said he was "disgusted" by Dortmund's poor showing, but was "happy [Köln] had won the title in the end."

Match-fixing suspicion 
Suggestions from the supervisory committee of the German Football Association that the match had been fixed were contested by Borussia Dortmund. Defender Amand Theis explained that "in the end, every shot was a goal and we just gave up." Borussia Mönchengladbach's Herbert Wimmer, for whom the 12–0 victory was his final Bundesliga game, said in an interview that he was happy the club did not win the league that season, because it could have lent more support to speculations of match-fixing. The German FA made their own enquiries and interviewed the Dortmund players, giving them a dressing-down for their unsporting behaviour, but chose not to press any charges.

The corresponding fixture in the following season four months later at Mönchengladbach's Bökelbergstadion ended in a 2–2 draw.

See also 

 Barcelona 1–1 Atlético Madrid (May 2014)
 Liverpool F.C. 0–2 Arsenal F.C. (26 May 1989)
 Brazil v Germany (2014 FIFA World Cup)
 Barcelona 6–1 Paris Saint-Germain
 Australia 31–0 American Samoa

References

External links 
 Matchday line-ups at fussballdaten.de 

1977–78 in German football
Bundesliga 1977-78
Bundesliga 1977-78
Sport in Düsseldorf
Record association football wins
Bundesliga matches
Football in North Rhine-Westphalia
April 1978 sports events in Europe